Edwin Belcher (born 1845) was an officer in the Union Army during the American Civil War, a Freedmen Bureau official in Monroe County, Georgia after the war, and then a state senator in the Georgia Legislature representing Wilkes County, Georgia during the Reconstruction Era.

Military service
Edwin Belcher reportedly served in a white regiment and was twice taken prisoner during the Civil War. When his background was discovered he reportedly said he did his duty like any other soldier.

Political office
Belcher was also appointed an assessor of revenue for Georgia's third district by U.S. President Ulysses S. Grant and was later appointed by Grant as postmaster in Macon, Georgia. After the 1868 election the legislature refused to seat African Americans. More than two dozen were turned away but Belcher and a few others were allowed to remain because they had light complexions and it could not be proved they were 1/8 or more "Negro". The others allowed to remain in their elected offices were Madison Davis of Clarke County, F. H. Fyall of Macon County and Thomas P. Beard of Richmond County.

Law career
In 1872 he graduated from Howard University's law school (founded in 1869) and was admitted to the bar in Washington D.C. His brother Eugene R. Belcher was also part of one of the earliest Howard University Law School classes.

In 1878, Belcher wrote a letter introducing himself to William Lloyd Garrison. In the letter he says he was "born the slave of my father".

Legacy
Drew S. Days III, former Solicitor General of the United States, is a descendant of the Belcher family.

References

African-American state legislators in Georgia (U.S. state)
Georgia (U.S. state) postmasters
1845 births
Original 33
African-American politicians during the Reconstruction Era
Union Army officers
Year of death missing
Republican Party Georgia (U.S. state) state senators
Howard University alumni